Sir John Brinsmead Latey, MBE (7 March 1914 – 24 April 1999) was a British judge.

Born in London, Latey was the son of the divorce barrister William Latey QC and the grandson of the journalist John Latey. He was educated at Westminster School and Christ Church, Oxford, where he took a Third in Jurisprudence in 1935. He was called to the bar by the Middle Temple in 1936.

Initially refused for wartime service due to poor eyesight, Latey was commissioned into the Royal Army Pay Corps in 1942, and subsequently transferred to the Judge Advocate's Department.  He was appointed a MBE (Military Division) in 1943.

After the War he returned to the bar, and was appointed a Queen's Counsel in 1957. In 1965, on the recommendation of Lord Gardiner, Latey was appointed to the High Court and assigned to the Probate, Divorce and Admiralty Division, receiving the customary knighthood. He was appointed to the Privy Council in 1986, and retired from the bench in 1989. In 1965–67, he chaired a committee that reviewed reducing the UK's age of majority from 21 to 18. The committee's recommendation was accepted in the Family Law Reform Act of 1969.

References 

1914 births
1999 deaths
Probate, Divorce and Admiralty Division judges
Royal Army Pay Corps officers
English King's Counsel
Knights Bachelor
Members of the Privy Council of the United Kingdom
Members of the Order of the British Empire
Members of the Middle Temple
People educated at Westminster School, London
Alumni of Christ Church, Oxford
British Army personnel of World War II